Tan Sri Datuk Patinggi Dr. George Chan Hong Nam (born 24 September 1936), is the former Deputy Chief Minister of Sarawak, state Industrial Development Minister and state Tourism and Heritage Minister. He is now the former member of the Sarawak State Legislative Assembly for Piasau, Miri after having lost his seat to the Democratic Action Party in the 2011 Sarawak State Election. He is also former President of the Sarawak United Peoples' Party (SUPP), a major component party of the ruling Barisan Nasional after having no interest to seek presidential election.

Dr George Chan, who was the deputy chief minister, ended up Barisan Nasional's biggest casualty when DAP first-timer Alan Ling Sie Kiong turned giant-killer in Piasau. The defeat marks one of the 2 biggest upset in Sarawak State election 2011.

After losing state election in his constituency, he had sent a resignation letter to the party but was asked by the central committee members to stay on until the party's Triennial Delegates Conference (TDC) which was held recently in December 2011.

Ling, a lawyer, polled 5,998 votes to Dr Chan's 4,408 to win by a 1,590-vote majority.

Personal life
Dr. Chan is divorced from his American wife of Irish descent, Datin Patinggi Puan Sri Judith Chan. The couple has four daughters. One of their daughters, Anisa Chan is married to Sarawak Chief Minister Pehin Sri Abdul Taib Mahmud's son Datuk Seri Sulaiman Abdul Rahman.

Dr. Chan received his primary education in Miri at St. Joseph's Primary School and his secondary education in Kuching at St. Joseph's Secondary School Kuching. After his senior Cambridge examination he left for Australia under the Colombo Plan scholarship to do his Medicine at the University of Sydney and graduated with an MBBS in 1963.

Dr. Chan married Datin Patinggi Puan Sri Datuk Wira Lorna Enan Muloon, the adopted daughter of the late Dato Sri Joseph Balan Seling in 2009, in a private ceremony. They have often been seen together at public functions.

Honours

Honours of Malaysia
  :
  Officer of the Order of the Defender of the Realm (KMN) (1979)
  Commander of the Order of Loyalty to the Crown of Malaysia (PSM) - Tan Sri (2000)

  :
  Knight Commander of the Order of the Star of Sarawak (PNBS) - Dato Sri (1990)
  Knight Commander of the Order of the Star of Hornbill Sarawak (DA) - Datuk Amar (1998)
  Knight Grand Commander of the Order of the Star of Hornbill Sarawak (DP) - Datuk Patinggi (2005)

References

External links
 SUPP Profile: George Chan Hong Nam
 Dewan Undangan Negeri Sarawak Kawasan Pilihanraya: N.63 PIASAU

Living people
1936 births
People from Sarawak
Malaysian medical doctors
Knights Commander of the Order of the Star of Hornbill Sarawak
Knights Grand Commander of the Order of the Star of Hornbill Sarawak
Malaysian politicians of Chinese descent
Officers of the Order of the Defender of the Realm
Sarawak United Peoples' Party politicians
Knights Commander of the Most Exalted Order of the Star of Sarawak
Chan Hong Nam, George
Commanders of the Order of Loyalty to the Crown of Malaysia
Recipients of the Civil Administration Medal (Sarawak)
University of Sydney alumni
Members of the Dewan Rakyat
Members of the Sarawak State Legislative Assembly
Deputy Chief Ministers of Sarawak